Abo of Tiflis (c. 756 – 6 January 786) was an early Christian martyr of Arab origin, who went on to practice his faith in what is now Tbilisi, the capital of present-day Georgia.

Life
Arab by origin, Abo initially grew up as a Muslim in Baghdad. At the age of seventeen or eighteen, he found himself in Tbilisi, having followed Georgian Prince Nerses, the ruler of Kartli. Nerses, having been slandered before the Caliph, spent three years in confinement; freed by a new Caliph, he took Abo with him.

Abo's profession in Baghdad was that of a perfumer, in which he excelled as a maker of fine perfumes and ointments, the art evidently implying knowledge of chemistry. On his arrival to Eastern Georgia (Kartli) he became convinced of Christianity, which didn't happen immediately, but only after a committed soul-searching that involved heated quarrels even with Christian priests and bishops over the finer religious matters; those quarrels only consolidated him in his conviction that the truth was in Christianity. However, initially Abo was afraid to convert openly as eastern Georgia was under Arab rule; he only abandoned the Muslim habit of five-times prayers per-day and started praying in a Christian manner. For political reasons, his prince had to seek shelter in Khazaria north of the Caspian Sea, an area which was not ruled by Muslims; Abo accompanied him, and was baptized there. From Khazaria, Nerses moved to Abkhazia, that was also free from the Arab dominion, taking Abo with him. There in Abkhazia Abo zealously followed the Christian life of prayers and ascetic struggles, preparing himself for a future mission.  Prince Nerses and his party returned to Tbilisi in 782, and Abo, notwithstanding the warning that it was not safe for him to go to Tbilisi, followed him. For about three years, Abo openly confessed his Christian faith on the streets of Tbilisi - both fortifying by his example the Christians who attempted to escape Arab rule and trying to convert his Arab compatriots to Christianity. A series of threats and warnings failed to dampen his zeal. In 786, he was denounced as a Christian to the Arab officials in Tbilisi, and arrested. The judge attempted to persuade Abo to return to the faith of his ancestors. He confessed his faith at trial, was imprisoned, and executed on 6 January 786.

Ioane Sabanisdze, Georgian religious writer and Abo's contemporary, compiled the martyr's life in his hagiographic novel The Martyrdom of Saint Abo.

See also
 List of Georgians
 List of Iraqis

Gallery

Notes

References
Attwater, Donald and Catherine Rachel John. The Penguin Dictionary of Saints. 3rd edition. New York: Penguin Books, 1993. .
Holweck, F. G., A Biographical Dictionary of the Saints. St. Louis, MO: B. Herder Book Co. 1924.

External links

786 deaths
People from Baghdad
Converts to Christianity from Islam
Saints of Georgia (country)
8th-century Christian saints
8th-century Christian martyrs
8th-century executions by the Umayyad Caliphate
History of Tbilisi
Christianity in Tbilisi
Iraqi former Muslims
Christian saints killed by Muslims
People executed for apostasy from Islam
8th-century births
Arab Christian saints
8th-century Arabs